Domestic Meddlers is a 1928 American silent comedy film directed by James Flood and starring Claire Windsor, Lawrence Gray and Roy D'Arcy.

Cast
 Claire Windsor as Claire 
 Lawrence Gray as Walter 
 Roy D'Arcy as Lew 
 Jed Prouty as Jonsey

References

Bibliography
 Darby, William. Masters of Lens and Light: A Checklist of Major Cinematographers and Their Feature Films. Scarecrow Press, 1991.

External links

1928 films
1928 comedy films
Silent American comedy films
Films directed by James Flood
American silent feature films
1920s English-language films
Tiffany Pictures films
American black-and-white films
1920s American films